York House may refer to:

Royal residences

York House was traditionally the name given, often temporarily, to houses in London, England occupied by holders of the title of Duke of York:

Albany (London) in Piccadilly
Cumberland House in Pall Mall
Dover House in Whitehall
Lancaster House in Pall Mall
York House, St James's Palace, a wing of St. James's Palace

Other structures

in Canada
York House School at Vancouver, British Columbia

in England
York House School, Redheath, Croxley Green, Hertfordshire
York House, Strand in the Strand, London
York House, Twickenham in the London suburb of Twickenham, which now serves as the town hall, a tourist attraction, wedding venue and filming location
York House, Waterloo, an office building in Lambeth, London
in Grenada

 York House, Grenada, the former home of the Grenadian Parliament
in Hong Kong
York House, Hong Kong in The Landmark, Hong Kong, see Hongkong Land

in the United States
York House (Napa, California)
York House (Mountain City, Georgia), listed on the NRHP in Georgia
York House (Pikeville, Kentucky), listed on the NRHP in Kentucky
York Mansion, Pikeville, Kentucky, listed on the NRHP in Kentucky
York-Skinner House, Westfield, New York
York-Gordon House, New Bern, North Carolina, listed on the NRHP in North Carolina